Keith Rankin is an American electronic musician who records under the alias Giant Claw, a largely vaporwave and psychedelic music project. He is also known for the vaporwave project Death's Dynamic Shroud, which he joined in 2014.  

AllMusic biographer Paul Simpson describes Rankin's music as Giant Claw as ranging "from dense sound collages and synth freak-outs to mutated prog rock and psychedelia to footwork and vaporwave". In 2010, the year Giant Claw debuted, Rankin launched the label Orange Milk with his friend Seth Graham, aiming to release records by underground American musicians. The artwork for all of the label's releases have been designed by Rankin himself. Fact Magazine have ranked the label as one of the 10 best of both 2013 and 2016.

The 2014 album Dark Web was praised by Stereogum for its deconstructed sound collage style, combining dub music and beat-driven styles. Other works have similarly been praised.

Selected discography

Midnight Murder (2011)
Tunnel Mind (2011)
Clash of Moons (2012)
Mutant Glamour (2012)
Music for Film (2013)
Dark Web (2014)
Deep Thoughts (2015)
Soft Channel (2017)
Mirror Guide (2021)

References

Vaporwave musicians
Psychedelic musicians
Electronic musicians
Musicians from Columbus, Ohio
Living people
Year of birth missing (living people)